The following is an episode list for the Discovery Channel reality television series Sons of Guns.

Episodes

Reception

Episode premieres were watched by an average of 1.79 million people, making the show the third-ranked Wednesday night, non-sports, cable network series.

Season one (2011)
In season one, episode run lengths are 30 minutes.

Season two (2011–12)
Beginning with season two, episode run lengths are 60 minutes.

{{Episode table|background=#C58A00|overall=|season=|title=|airdate=|episodes=

{{Episode list
| EpisodeNumber= 26
| EpisodeNumber2 = 10
| Title= Guns of Glory
| OriginalAirDate= 
| ShortSummary= This was presented as a Thanksgiving Special Presentation following Pumpkin Chunkin 2011. This filming of this episode took place prior to the Season 2 Finale.

The Red Jacket staff counts down their Top 10 Guns thus far, as well as reveal moments that occurred off camera:
GE Minigun -  The team discusses the history of the weapon, as well as the Hollywood concept of a minigun backpack seen in various action films, specifically the scenes from Predator.
Tommy Gun - The team discusses Vince's opposition to modernizing an "American Classic", Will's ""They will die!!!" quote during testing and how it has become a staple in promoting safety; as well as Kris' terrible James Cagney impersonation.
Mag 58 - Will and Steph discuss their experience from shooting from the helicopter.
Master Key - Vince discusses his shyness toward camera and his firsthand experience in Reality TV, as well as the overall construction of the build including moments that happened off camera and during testing. Right before introducing the master key, Vince can be seen lifting the propeller from the maxim test rig from season 3 off of Kris's bench.
Meat Chopper - Flemm discusses almost losing his finger, as well as Charlie and Joe's issues with the remote control planes.
.50 Caliber Machine Gun M2 "Ma Deuce" (and .50 Caliber Barrett)' - Will discuss the difference between the two weapons, while Kris and Steph debate which of the two guns are better.
Lahti - The team discuss the size and power of the weapon, while Vince mentions about the  Smurf obsession during the build.
Integrally Suppressed AK - The team discusses the impact of the weapon had in the business, as well as Kris' legendary water scene in the end credits of the episode... and the problems that occurred after filming.
1919 Machine Gun - The team recalls Mike Johnson, a police officer who wanted a shoulder fired 1919, as well as the visit from Paul Jr. Designs telling them to come back and visit.
 AK-47 - Will discusses the first firearm he built in his life, then leaves a final message to the fans that Red Jacket is just getting started.
| LineColor=C58A00
}}

}}

Season three (2012)
Season three premiered February 29, 2012.

Season four (2013)
Season four premiered April 19, 2013 and ended on June 7.

Season five (2014)
Season five premiered March 21 and ended on May 16, 2014.

References

External links
 Sons of Guns press release
 Red Jacket Firearms Official Site
 Sons of Guns'' at Discovery Channel
 Sons of Guns episodes at Discovery Channel

Lists of American non-fiction television series episodes
Lists of reality television series episodes